Ovechkino is a rural locality (a station) in Ovechkinsky Selsoviet, Zavyalovsky District, Altai Krai, Russia. The population was 120 as of 2013. There are 3 streets.

Geography 
Ovechkino is located 24 km north-east from Zavyalovo (the district's administrative centre) by road.

References 

Rural localities in Zavyalovsky District, Altai Krai